Barbula unguiculata is a species of moss belonging to the family Pottiaceae.

Barbula unguiculata is known to be able to use artificial light to grow in places which are otherwise devoid of natural light, such as Niagara Cave and Crystal Cave in Wisconsin.

References

Pottiaceae
Taxa named by Johann Hedwig